Chris Benard (born April 4, 1990) is an American track and field athlete who competes in the triple jump. He was a finalist at the 2016 IAAF World Indoor Championships.

Professional

Benard made his international debut for his country at the 2012 NACAC Under-23 Championships in Athletics. There, he took the silver medal behind fellow American Chris Phipps.

Personal records

Outdoor
Triple jump – (Wind: -0.0 m/s) (2017)
Long jump – (Wind: +1.6 m/s) (2014)

Indoor
Triple jump –  (2020)
Long jump –  (2014)
60-meter dash – 7.05 seconds (2015)
All information from IAAF

US Track and field Championships
At the 2019 USA Outdoor Track and Field Championships Chris Benard placed fourth in the triple jump turned into a tough competition with winner Donald Scott who won on his first jump in wet conditions.

At the 2018 IAAF Diamond League Final Memorial Van Damme in Brussels, Belgium Chris Benard placed fifth in the triple jump after jumping .

At the 2018 USA Outdoor Track and Field Championships Chris Benard placed second in the triple jump turned into a tough competition with winner Donald Scott who won on his last jump.

At the 2018 USA Indoor Track and Field Championships Chris Benard moved from 7th to 4th in the last jump of the triple jump.

At the 2017 USA Outdoor Track and Field Championships Chris Benard was again in the top three of the triple jump.

At the start of 2016 he took third at the USA Indoor Championships. This earned Benard his global debut for the United States, as he was entered into the 2016 IAAF World Indoor Championships and finished eleventh.

At the 2015 USA Indoor Track and Field Championships he was again in the top three of both horizontal jumps. He was short of seventeen metres at the 2015 USA Outdoor Championships and beaten into fourth place (Marquis Dendy took the final spot on the team for the 2015 World Championships in Athletics).

At the 2014 USA Outdoor Track and Field Championships he set another best, this time in the triple jump with a mark of  – his first beyond seventeen metres. That brought him third place behind the top two at the last Olympics, Christian Taylor and Will Claye.

Personal biography
Born to Fay and Thomas Benard in Tustin, California, he grew up in nearby Corona and attended Santiago High School.

NCAA
Benard earned his place among America's top triple jumpers after graduation from Arizona State. Bernard earned eight All-American as a college student-athlete. He gained an athletic scholarship to attended Arizona State University and competed for the Arizona State Sun Devils track team.

In his last appearance at NCAA level, Chris Benard placed tenth overall at the 2013 NCAA Indoor meet.

Chris Benard competed well at NCAA taking the runner-up spot at the 2012 NCAA Men's Division I Indoor Track and Field Championships.

Chris Benard competed well at NCAA level, coming 19th in his debut at the 2011 NCAA Men's Division I Outdoor Track and Field Championships.

Competing for Riverside City College, Bernard earned two All-American awards in 2010 from National Junior College Athletic Association.

References

External links

IAAF Diamond League profile for Chris Benard
Arizona State University February 2012 highlight profile of Chris Benard
2016 FloTrack interview of Team USA Olympian Triple jump  Chris Benard after qualifying for Rio Olympics

Living people
1990 births
People from Tustin, California
Track and field athletes from California
American male triple jumpers
African-American male track and field athletes
Arizona State Sun Devils men's track and field athletes
Riverside City College alumni
Sportspeople from Orange County, California
Athletes (track and field) at the 2016 Summer Olympics
Olympic track and field athletes of the United States
Olympic male triple jumpers
Athletes (track and field) at the 2020 Summer Olympics
21st-century African-American sportspeople